James Willard Schultz, or Apikuni, (August 26, 1859 – June 11, 1947) was an American author, explorer, Glacier National Park guide, fur trader and historian of the Blackfeet Indians.  He operated a fur trading post at Carroll, Montana  and lived among the Pikuni tribe during the period 1880-82. He was given the name Apikuni by the Pikuni chief, Running Crane. Apikuni in Blackfeet means "Spotted Robe."  Schultz is most noted for his 37 books, most about Blackfoot life, and for his contributions to the naming of prominent features in Glacier National Park.

Early life
Schultz was born August 26, 1859 in Boonville, New York  to well-to-do parents, Frances and Philander Bushrod Schults [as they spelled it].  The house where he was born is marked with a plaque as a New York State Historic Landmark.  Young James enjoyed the outdoors and his father ensured he was mentored by experienced outdoorsmen and hunters in the Adirondacks during camping and hunting trips.  He became an experienced shooter at an early age.

Early years in Montana
As a young adult, Schultz moved to Fort Conrad, Montana, on the Marias River. He stayed at Fort Conrad from 1877 to 1885, and established a trading post there in 1880. During that time period he traded with the Pikuni and the Blood and established another trading post at Carroll, Montana on the Missouri River, where he also traded with the Cree.

Glacier National Park
In the mid-1880s, Schultz began to spend more time in the Two Medicine and Saint Mary Lakes region of what is now Glacier National Park guiding and outfitting local hunters. In late 1884 he sent an article entitled "To Chief Mountain" to Forest and Stream, one of his first literary efforts. The article was published in 1885 At the time George Bird Grinnell was the magazine's editor, and he became intrigued with Schultz and the Glacier region.  Grinnell solicited Schultz to outfit and guide him on a hunting trip in Glacier in September 1885.  Although the trip was not a great success for Grinnell, he did kill a Bighorn ram on a mountain near the Upper Saint Mary Lake with a single shot.

Schultz promptly named the mountain Singleshot Mountain to honor Grinnell's feat.  Thus began decades of Schultz naming features in the Glacier regions for clients and friends, and to honor traditional Indian names. Montana State University Library has a digital library of papers and photographs documenting Schultz's time in Montana and Glacier National Park, as well as the physical materials that are part of James Willard Schultz's collection, which are held at the Montana State University's Archives and Special Collections.

Glacier features named by Schultz 
 Divide Mountain
 Flattop Mountain - : 
 Grinnell Glacier was named by Lt. John H. Beacom of the USGS in 1887.  This fact is verifiable in both journals kept by George Bird Grinnell and John H. Beacom.  Schultz was in the group that first heard the name.
 Grinnell Mountain was also named by Lt. John H. Beacom in 1887.
 Grinnell Lake Schultz was among a small group of men who named Grinnell Lake in 1887 or 1889.
 Going-to-the-Sun Mountain - : 
 Singleshot Mountain
 White Fish Mountain, originally named Yellow Fish Mountain by Schultz

Glacier features named for Schultz 
 Apikuni Creek - , el. 
 Apikuni Flat - , el. 
 Apikuni Falls - , el. 
 Apikuni Mountain - , el.

Arizona
Schultz first visited Arizona in 1906–07, during which time he assisted J. Walter Fewkes in the excavation and restoration of the pueblo ruins at Casa Grande. Due to his success as a writer and explorer, in 1913 he became the first non-resident to build a cabin in the remote White Mountains, near Greer, Arizona.  He would use the cabin as a seasonal retreat for decades.

Author
James Willard Schultz started writing at the age of 21, publishing articles and stories in Forest and Stream for 15 years. He did not write his first book until 1907 at age 48. The memoir: ''My Life as an Indian tells the story of his first year living with the Pikuni tribe of Blackfeet Indians east of Glacier.  In 1911, he associated himself with publishers Houghton Mifflin; the firm published Schultz's subsequent books for the next 30 years. In 1918 he authored Bird Woman, a novel about Sacajawea. His son, Lone Wolf, provided the illustrations for the novel, and Schultz dedicated the book to him: "Born near the close of the buffalo days he was, and ever since with his baby hands he began to model statuettes of horses and buffalo and deer with clay from the river banks, his one object has been the world of art."

In all, Schultz wrote and published 37 fiction and non-fiction books dealing with the Blackfeet, Kootenai, and Flathead Indians. His works received critical literary acclaim from the general media as well as academia for his story telling and contributions to ethnology. Sometime after 1902, while living in Southern California, Schultz worked for a while as the literary editor of the Los Angeles Times.

Family

Schultz's first marriage in 1879 was to Natahki (meaning "Fine Shield Woman"), a Piegan Blackfeet. Natahki was a survivor of the Baker massacre in 1870. They had a son named Hart Merriam Schultz, or Lone Wolf (1882–1965). He was named after Schultz's boyhood friend Clinton Hart Merriam. Natahki died in 1903.

In 1907 while Schultz was living in Los Angeles as the literary editor for the Los Angeles Times, he married Celia Hawkins of Highland Park, IL (b. 1865, d. 1960) .  It is believed that she went to Los Angeles in response to his advertisement for a wife.  Some time thereafter, they resumed his life with the Indians.  They lived in Butterfly Lodge in Greer, occupying the cabin starting in 1914  .  The dedication of his book “With the Indians in the Rockies” (published in 1912) reads:  “This book is affectionately dedicated to my wife Celia Hawkins Schultz whose good comradeship and sympathy have been my greatest help in writing this tale”.  The Blackfoot gave her the name “No-Coward Woman” after she had an encounter with a grizzly bear.

She lived with Schultz from their marriage in 1907 until she left him in 1928.  This period marks the time of his most extensive literary output as he wrote the majority of his books during this time.  Their divorce was made final in 1930, and in 1932 a settlement was finalized in which she received half of the royalties from his works published before 1930.  Celia Hawkins Schultz died in 1960 in Highland Park, IL, one month shy of her 95th birthday.

Schultz married again, to Jessica 'Jessie' Schultz. (Jessica Louise Donaldson had been a teacher in a one-room schoolhouse in Grayling, Montana, and later earned an MA in Anthropology from the University of CA. In 1926-7, as a professor of English at Montana State College, now Montana State University-Bozeman, she helped write and produce a play/pageant entitled 'The Masque of the Absaroka'. It focused on Absaroka (Crow) culture, featuring numerous Native Americans from the Crow Nation. She was a lifelong advocate for Northern Plains Indian culture, and particularly for the welfare of women, assisting with the development of markets for the sale of bead and leather goods.) Jessie made arrangements to publish some of Schultz's works posthumously, such as Bear Chief's War Shirt. She married again after his death, to Henry Graham.

Death

James Schultz suffered from ill health for most of his last 30 years. Guiding in the rugged Glacier area took its toll physically.  He suffered from incapacitating lung and heart infections. In 1931 he injured his spine.  In 1942 he fell, breaking his left leg and right arm.  In September 1944, a fall at his home in Denver broke his hip and required major surgery to repair. His deteriorating health severely reduced his ability to write and concentrate. After moving to the Wind River Reservation in Wyoming to be close to the Native American tribes he grew up with, he suffered a fatal heart attack and died on June 11, 1947.  He wanted to be buried in Montana and was laid to rest on the Blackfeet Reservation  near Browning, Montana in the old burial ground of the family of Natahki, his first wife.

List of works

Books by Schultz
 
 
 
 
 
 
 
 
 
 
 
 
 
 
 
 
 
 
 
 
 
 
 
 
 
 
 
 
 
 
 
 
 
 
 
 
 
  (published posthumously)
  (published posthumously)

Notes

External links
 Collection 0010: James Willard Schultz Papers, 1867-1969. Collection includes biographical materials, research, correspondence, memorabilia, and photographs. Held at Montana State University's Archives and Special Collections. 
 
 
 
 Butterfly Lodge Museum
 National Park Service's Man in Glacier, article with mention of Schultz's various contributions
   

Historians of Native Americans
Glacier National Park (U.S.)
Writers from Montana
1947 deaths
1859 births
People from Boonville, New York
Historians from New York (state)
Notable residents of Montana